= Ratan Estate =

Zamindar Estate in India (1700–1949)

- 1700–1949
- Common languages: Thēthi, Hindi
- Government: Zamindari Estate
- Zamindar
  - Unknown: Babu Tribhuvan Das and Totaram Singh (first)
  - 1941–1949: Babu Maheswari Prasad and Nawab AW khan (last)
- History
  - Established: 1700
  - Acceded to India: 1949
- Currency: Indian Rupee
Succeeded by
Dominion of India
- Today part of: Bihar, Republic of India

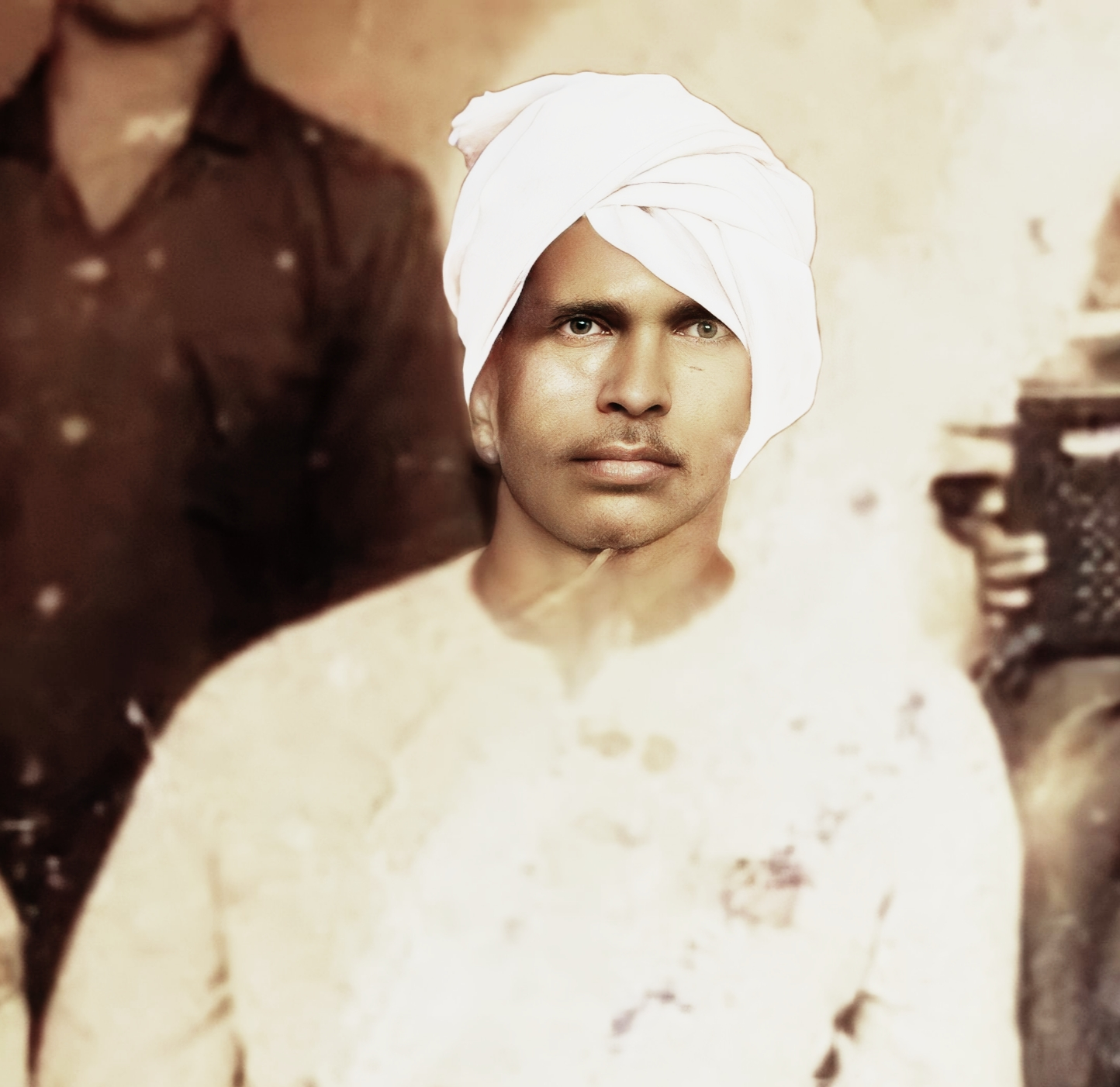
Maheswari Prasad zamindar of Ratan Estate, Gopalpur and chausa.

The Ratan Estate was at one time part of a larger mahal in 1860, at some date not definitely specified, it was formed into a separate revenue paying estate. At the earliest time to which the evidence relates it belonged to three persons named Tribhuvan Das, Tota Ram Singh and Bhukan Singh who admittedly held it in co-parcenary, The Estate was situated mostly in Mongyr with a portion in Bhagalpur. Nawab Khan the father of the Abdul Wahab Khan purchased 3 annas share out of the 5 annas odd share of Gope family, later on Nawab Khan was shot dead By Gope family and the Estate became a Ward Estate till passing down to his Minor son Abdul wahab Khan.

== History ==
The collection in Estate was very poor because there was no proper management and there was difficulty in taking over the management of estate because of the disputes between the Co-sharers On the 25th May 1894, Nawab Khan Zamindar of Ratan Estate was Murdered by his co-sharers. He left two widows and his son Abdul Wahab Khan behind him, eventually the Estate was sold in 1927 by Nawab Abdul Wahab Khan to Babu Santlal Das Zamindar of Karari Tintanga.
